{{DISPLAYTITLE:C10H17NO2}}
The molecular formula C10H17NO2 (molar mass: 183.25 g/mol, exact mass: 183.1259 u) may refer to:

 Methyprylon
 PD-217,014